Walnut Springs Independent School District is a public school district based in Walnut Springs, Texas, United States.
Located in Bosque County, the district extends into a small portion of Somervell County. Walnut Springs ISD has one school that serves students in  prekindergarten through grade 12.

Academic achievement
In 2015, the school was rated "met standard" by the Texas Education Agency.

Special programs

Athletics
Walnut Springs High School plays six-man football.

The district has a boys' basketball team and a girls' basketball team.

The district also has a golf team and a track and field team.

See also

List of school districts in Texas

References

External links
Walnut Springs ISD

School districts in Bosque County, Texas
School districts in Somervell County, Texas